The 2016–17 Ligue 2 (referred to as the Domino's Ligue 2 for sponsorship reasons) season is the 78th season since its establishment. The fixtures were announced on 6 June 2016.

Teams

There are 20 clubs in the league, with three promoted teams from Championnat National replacing the three teams that were relegated from Ligue 2 following the 2015–16 season. All clubs that secured Ligue 2 status for the season were subject to approval by the DNCG before becoming eligible to participate.

As of 30 May 2016, the following teams have mathematically achieved qualification for the 2016–17 season. They are listed below in alphabetical order.

 Ajaccio
 Amiens
 Auxerre
 Bourg-en-Bresse
 Brest
 Clermont
 Gazélec Ajaccio
 Laval
 Le Havre
 Lens
 Nîmes
 Niort
 Orléans
 Red Star
 Reims
 Sochaux
 Strasbourg
 Tours
 Troyes
 Valenciennes

Teams average home attendances

RC Lens drew the highest average home league attendance (28,996), followed by RC Strasbourg (17,013) and Stade de Reims (10,403).

Team changes

To Ligue 2
Promoted from National
  Strasbourg
  Orléans
  Amiens
Relegated from Ligue 1
  Troyes
  Gazélec Ajaccio
  Reims

From Ligue 2
Relegated to National
 Evian TG
 Paris FC
 Créteil
Promoted to Ligue 1
 Nancy
 Dijon
 Metz

Stadia and locations

 1 Red Star original stadium, Stade Bauer, is not permitted to host professional matches. The club are playing their home games at Stade Jean-Bouin.

Personnel and kits

1Subject to change during the season.

Managerial changes

League table

Results

Top scorers

Play-offs
The 2016–17 season will see the return of a relegation play-off between the 18th placed Ligue 1 team and the 3rd placed team in the Ligue 2 in a two-legged confrontation. The Ligue 2 team will host the first game. Another relegation play-off involves the 18th placed Ligue 2 team and the 3rd placed National team also in two legs.

Orléans won 2–0 on aggregate.

Attendances

References

Ligue 2 seasons
2
France